Tazeh Qeshlaq may refer to:
 Tazeh Qeshlaq, Ardabil
 Tazeh Qeshlaq, Zanjan
 Tazeh Qeshlaq, alternate name of Vakil Qeshlaq, Zanjan Province